The Drug Policy Alliance (DPA) is a New York City–based nonprofit organization that seeks to advance policies that “reduce the harms of both drug use and drug prohibition, and to promote the sovereignty of individuals over their minds and bodies”  The organization prioritizes reducing the role of criminalization in drug policy, advocating for the legal regulation of marijuana, and promoting health-centered drug policies. DPA has been led by executive director Kassandra Frederique since September 2020.

Overview
The Drug Policy Alliance was formed when the Drug Policy Foundation and the Lindesmith Center merged in July 2000. Lindesmith Center founder Ethan Nadelmann served as its first Executive Director.

Broadcast journalist Walter Cronkite spoke out against the War on Drugs in support of the Drug Policy Alliance. He appeared in advertisements on behalf of the organization and wrote a fundraising letter, which was also published in The Huffington Post.
In the letter, Cronkite wrote: "Today, our nation is fighting two wars: one abroad and one at home. While the war in Iraq is in the headlines, the other war is still being fought on our own streets. Its casualties are the wasted lives of our own citizens. I am speaking of the war on drugs. And I cannot help but wonder how many more lives, and how much more money, will be wasted before another Robert McNamara admits what is plain for all to see: the war on drugs is a failure."

Main issues

Cannabis
DPA believes that cannabis should be legalized and regulated for adult use and for medicinal purposes. DPA believes marijuana should be removed from the criminal legal system and regulated responsibly with equity, social justice, and community reinvestment at the core.

Drug war
DPA believes that the War on Drugs in America has failed. They present the argument that the United States has spent billions of dollars on making the country drug-free, but many illicit drugs, such as heroin, cocaine, methamphetamine and many others, are more potent and prevalent than ever before.

Overdose
DPA believes the growing numbers of deaths due to drug overdose should be dealt with as a medical rather than a criminal issue. They present drug decriminalization, methadone and buprenorphine access, naloxone access, overdose prevention centers, drug checking, and Good Samaritan laws as their solutions.

Parents, teens, and drugs
DPA believes that young people need access to credible information regarding decisions and information on drugs. They believe that open and honest dialogue is the key, and with this idea started the Safety First Project.

Health approaches
DPA believes that drug use should be treated as a health issue instead of a criminal issue and advocates for harm reduction and drug decriminalization.

Law
DPA believes that many of the arrests for drug possession conflict with the constitutional rights of Americans.  DPA has also provided funding for Flex Your Rights, a nonprofit organization that educates the public about their constitutional rights during police encounters.

Communities affected
DPA believes that the war on drugs does not affect all of the American population the same way, and that some communities are disproportionately affected.

Drug policy around the world
DPA states that many countries around the world are approaching their own war on drugs in a different way than the United States does and that many of the countries can lead as examples for many new approaches in the U.S.

Results

DPA was a sponsor of California's 1996 landmark medical marijuana law, Proposition 215, which made cannabis available to patients as well as reduced criminal penalties for possession. Beginning with California in 1996, DPA has played a role in roughly half of the campaigns that have legalized medical marijuana in the U.S.

DPA played a role in all the campaigns to legalize marijuana for adult use more broadly to date: Colorado and Washington in 2012; Uruguay in 2013; Oregon, Alaska and Washington, D.C., in 2014; California, Massachusetts, Maine and Nevada in 2016; New Jersey in 2020; and New Mexico and New York in 2021.

In 2000, DPA helped push California's landmark treatment-not-incarceration law called Proposition 36. It replaces jail time with substance abuse treatment for first and second time nonviolent drug offenders. More than 84,000 people were removed from jail and graduated from treatment.

DPA has been involved with other drug sentencing reforms including the repeal of New York's Rockefeller drug laws in 2009, the federal Fair Sentencing Act in 2010, Proposition 36 in 2012 which reformed California's Three Strikes Law, Proposition 47 in 2014 which changed some nonviolent offenses like simple drug possession from felonies to misdemeanors in California, bail reform in New Jersey in 2014, and asset forfeiture reforms in California, Florida, and New Mexico in 2015-16.

In 2006, DPA got the "Blood-Borne Disease Harm Reduction Act" signed into law in New Jersey. It allows up to six cities to establish syringe access programs. This program is designed to prevent the spread of blood-borne diseases such as HIV/AIDS. DPA also played a role in efforts to make syringes legally available in New York (2000), California (2004) and supported  efforts in Connecticut, Illinois, and other states.

DPA has worked across the country to pass the "911 Good Samaritan Immunity Laws." These laws are to help encourage overdose witnesses to call 911. They reduce drug possession charges for those who seek medical help. DPA led a campaign in New Mexico to pass the law and were successful in 2007. DPA has also helped pass numerous naloxone access laws, including in California and New York to make it available over-the-counter. 

In 2020, DPA's advocacy and political arm, Drug Policy Action, spearheaded the passage of the Oregon Ballot Measure 110, which made Oregon the first state in the nation to decriminalize drug possession while significantly expanding access to evidence-informed, culturally-responsive treatment, harm reduction and other health services.

DPA awards
DPA gives biannual awards at its International Drug Policy Reform Conference to "honor advocates, elected officials and organizations for their courageous work in reforming drug laws.". These include
 Edward M. Brecher Award for Achievement in the Field of Journalism
 Richard J. Dennis Drugpeace Award for Outstanding Achievement in the Field of Drug Policy Reform
 Alfred R. Lindesmith Award for Achievement in the Field of Scholarship
 Robert C. Randall Award for Achievement in the Field of Citizen Action
 Norman E. Zinberg Award for Achievement in the Field of Medicine
 H.B. Spear Award for Achievement in the Field of Control and Enforcement
 Justice Gerald Le Dain Award for Achievement in the Field of Law
 Dr. Andrew Weil Award for Achievement in the Field of Drug Education

See also
Arguments for and against drug prohibition
Decriminalization of marijuana in the United States
Freedom of thought
Harm reduction
Prison reform
War on Drugs

References

External links

 6 September 1990 rare video of "National Public Radio's Morning Edition" at 01:40:06 of John P. Walters and opposing views by Arnold Trebach of the Drug Policy Foundation about the "War on Drugs."
Video appearances on C-SPAN
Global Commission on Drug Policy
The International Drug Policy Consortium
Global Drug Policy Program
Americans for Safe Access
LEAP - Law Enforcement Action Partnership
National Organization for the Reform of Marijuana Laws
Marijuana Policy Project
Students for a Sensible Drug Policy
San Francisco Drug Users Union
The Beckley Foundation

Cannabis law reform in the United States
Cannabis law reform organizations based in the United States
Drug policy organizations based in the United States
Drug policy reform
Non-profit organizations based in New York City
Organizations established in 1999
1999 establishments in New York (state)
Charities based in New York City
1999 in cannabis
501(c)(3) organizations